Bloomingdale Road may refer to:

 Bloomingdale Road (Staten Island), a road in Staten Island, New York
 A former name of part of Broadway (Manhattan)